"Starvin' Marvin" is an episode of South Park.
Starvin' Marvin, a South Park character

Starvin' Marvin may also refer to:
Starvin' Marvin (gas station), a chain of gas stations in the United States operated by Speedway LLC
"Starvin Marvin", a song by Raffi from Adult Entertainment